Faulenbach  is a river in Baden-Württemberg, Germany. It flows into the Elta in Wurmlingen.

See also
List of rivers of Baden-Württemberg

Rivers of Baden-Württemberg
Rivers of Germany